Six-time defending champions Nick Taylor and David Wagner defeated Dylan Alcott and Andrew Lapthorne in the final, 4–6, 6–2, [10–7] to win the quad doubles wheelchair tennis title at the 2015 US Open.

Draw

Final

External links
 Draw

Wheelchair Quad Doubles
U.S. Open, 2015 Quad Doubles